John Ennis may refer to:

John Ennis (actor) (born 1964), American actor and comic
John Ennis (baseball) (born 1979), American former Major League Baseball right-handed relief pitcher
John Wellington Ennis (born 1973), American filmmaker, activist, and blogger
Sir John Ennis, 1st Baronet (1800–1878), Member of Parliament for Athlone, 1857–1865
Sir John Ennis, 2nd Baronet (1842–1884), Member of Parliament for Athlone, 1868–1874 and 1880–1884
John Ennis v. Smith, see List of United States Supreme Court cases, volume 55
John Ennis, developer of Shippan Point
John Ennis (artist) (born 1953), American painter
John Ennis (poet) (born 1944), Irish poet
J. Matthew Ennis (1864–1921), English pianist and organist

See also
Ennis (disambiguation)